The Malla Reddy College of Engineering And Technology (MRCET AUTONOMOUS ) is a technical institute established in 2004 with the approval of the All India Council for Technical Education. It is located in Maisammaguda, Doolapally, Hyderabad. It is affiliated to the Jawaharlal Nehru Technological University, Hyderabad.

Campus and location 
The MRCET campus covers 30 acres. It is located Near Dhulapally Medchal (Mandal, Gundlapochampalli Village Rd, Maisammaguda, Hamlet, Secunderabad, Telangana 500014), India.

Under-Graduate Courses:

Post-Graduate Courses (Full-Time):

External links 
 

Engineering colleges in Hyderabad, India
2004 establishments in Andhra Pradesh
Educational institutions established in 2004